This is a list of the most notable films produced in cinema of Germany.

For an alphabetical list of articles on German films see :Category:German films.

1895–1945
List of German films of 1895–1918 (German Empire)
List of German films of 1919–1932 (Weimar Germany)
List of German films of 1933–1945 (Nazi Germany)

1945–1989
List of East German films from the 1949–1990 German Democratic Republic

In 1949, the current Federal Republic of Germany came into existence, as did the separate German Democratic Republic which ceased to exist in 1990 when its states acceded to the Federal Republic, which is informally since simply called Germany again.

Because of the impact of the Second World War, and restrictions imposed on the country by the allied powers, film production between 1945 and 1948 was limited and did not pick up really until after 1950. See also :Category:West German films

List of German films of 1945–1959
List of German films of the 1960s
List of German films of the 1970s
List of German films of the 1980s
List of German films of the 1990s
List of German films of the 2000s
List of German films of the 2010s
List of German films of the 2020s

See also
List of German-language films
List of years in Germany
List of years in German television

External links
 German film at the Internet Movie Database (maintains separate lists for West Germany and East Germany)